Lilah:
 Lilah - alternative name of planet Eris
 Lilah - given name
 Lilah Morgan
 Lilah Yassin